Football was one of the events at the 2010 South Asian Games. It was also the first to introduce Women's football to the Games, alongside Men's.

Men's U23

Accurate up to 2 June 2014.

Women

Accurate up to 2 June 2014

References

External links
RSSSF

2010 South Asian Games
2010 South Asian Games